Markus Münch may refer to:

 Markus Münch (footballer) (born 1972), German footballer
 Markus Münch (discus thrower) (born 1986), German discus thrower